Osvaldoginella hoffi is a species of sea snail, a marine gastropod mollusk, in the family Cystiscidae.

References

 Espinosa J. & Ortea J. (2018). Nuevas especies cubanas del género Osvaldoginella Espinosa & Ortea, 1977 (Gastropoda: Cystiscidae). Avicennia. 23: 45-50

hoffi
Gastropods described in 1991